Joe or Joseph Fraser may refer to:

Joseph Bacon Fraser (1895–1971), American general who served in World War I, World War II and Korean War
Joseph Bacon Fraser Jr. (1926–2014), American homebuilder and philanthropist, son of above
Joe Fraser (born 1998), English artistic gymnast, competitor in 2020 Summer Olympics

See also
Joseph Fraser Mooney (1927–2006), Canadian legislator in Nova Scotia
Jo Fraser (born 1986), Scottish painter specialising in portraiture